The year 2023 in art will involve various significant events.

Events
  February - The Joan Mitchell foundation issues a cease and desist letter to Louis Vuitton to stop using Joan Mitchell's paintings as the backdrop in one of the advertising campaigns for their signature handbags, saying that it is unauthorized and improper usage. 
 February 16 - A woman attending the Art Wynwood art fair in the Wynwood section of Miami, Florida taps a limited edition porcelain Jeff Koons Balloon Dog sculpture displayed at the Bel-Air Fine Art booth at the event knocking it to floor and shattering it into many many pieces and shards. Luckily for the interactive viewer there was no "Break it You Buy It" policy at the temporary gallery outpost and it was covered by insurance
 March - The Vatican Museums returns three historic 2,500 year old sculptures from the Parthenon in Athens to Greece.

Exhibitions
January 26 until April 16 - Beyond the Light: Identity and Place in Nineteenth-Century Danish Art at the Metropolitan Museum of Art in New York City.

Works
 Banksy - Valentine's day mascara in Margate, Kent, England
 Lucinda "La Morena" Hinojos - Super Bowl LVII Mural in Phoenix, Arizona
Shazia Sikander NowWitnessHank Willis Thomas - The Embrace installed on Boston Common in Boston, Massachusetts

Awards

Deaths
January 2 - Marilyn Stafford, 97, American photographer
January 3 
 Karim Bennani, 87, Moroccan painter
Zhou Lingzhao, 103, Chinese painter
Lyuben Zidarov, 97, Bulgarian illustrator and painter
January 5 - Michael Snow, 94, Canadian artist
January 9 - George S. Zimbel, 93, American-Canadian photographer
January 10 - Hans Belting, 87, German art historian
January 17 - Nicola Zamboni, 79, Italian sculptor
January 27 - Alfred Leslie, 95, American painter and filmmaker
February 13 - Jesse Treviño, 76, Mexican-American painter
February 14 - Anthony Green, 83, British painter
February 17 - Ángela Gurría, 93, Mexican sculptor
February 26 - Ans Westra, 86, Dutch-born New Zealand photographer (Washday at the Pa)
March 2 - Mary Bauermeister, 87, German visual artist and musician
March 3 
Camille Souter, 93, British-born Irish artist (death announced on this date)
Lou Stovall, 86, American visual artist 
Rafael Viñoly, 78, Uruguayan architect (The Cleveland Museum of Art)
March 5 - Piero Gilardi, 80, Italian sculptor
March 7 - Ian Falconer, 63, American illustrator (The New Yorker'')
March 11 - Bill Tidy, 89, British cartoonist
March 12 - Phyllida Barlow, 78, British visual artist
March 18 - Francisco Rodón, 88, Puerto Rican painter

References

 
2023 in the arts
2020s in art
Years of the 21st century in art
2023-related lists
Culture-related timelines by year